Irving "Irv" Broughton is a publisher, writer, filmmaker, and teacher known for having discovered the talent of poet Frank Stanford. The two met at the Hollins Conference on Creative Writing and Cinema in 1970. Broughton read Stanford's poems there and agreed to publish the poet's first book, The Singing Knives, which was published in 1971 by Broughton's Mill Mountain Press. Broughton published five more of Stanford's books of poetry between 1974 and 1976 on his press and co-published (with Lost Roads) Stanford's magnum opus, The Battlefield Where The Moon Says I Love You, in 1977. Broughton also made a film with/about Stanford titled It Wasn't A Dream, It Was A Flood, which won one of the Judge's Awards at the 1975 Northwest Film & Video Festival. Furthermore, the two interviewed and filmed writers together, the transcripts later appearing in The Writer's Mind: Interviews With American Authors, a three-volume set for which Broughton was editor.

Notes

Year of birth missing (living people)
Living people
American book publishers (people)